A lowboy is an American collectors term for one type of dressing table. It is a small table with one or two rows of drawers, so called in contradistinction to (and designed to match) the tallboy or highboy chest of drawers.

History and description

Lowboys and tallboys were favorite pieces of the 18th century, both in England and in the United States; the lowboy was most frequently used as a dressing-table, but sometimes as a side-table. It is usually made of oak, walnut or mahogany, with the drawer-fronts mounted with brass pulls and escutcheons. The more elegant examples in the Queen Anne, early Georgian, and Chippendale styles often have cabriole legs, carved knees, and slipper or claw-and-ball feet. The fronts of some examples also are sculpted with the scallop-shell motif beneath the center drawer.

Another term for a dressing table equipped with mirrors is vanity and is used to apply makeup and other fashion accessories.

See also 
 Chest of drawers
 Commode
 List of desk forms and types
 Sideboard

Citations

General and cited references 
 
 
 
 Attribution

External links 

 Dressing Tables collection at the Disseny Hub Barcelona

Cabinets (furniture)
Furniture